The Island Hotel (also known as Parsons and Hale's General Store) is a historic building in Cedar Key, Florida, located at 224 2nd Street. On November 23, 1984, it was added to the U.S. National Register of Historic Places.

The building was erected between 1859 and 1861 by Major John Parsons and Francis E. Hale for use as a general store. The Cedar Key Post Office and customs house were also located in the building in the 1860s. The building may have housed both Union and Confederate troops at various times during the Civil War, as the town changed hands more than once. Part of the building was used as a boarding house by the end of the 1880s. The store closed in 1910. The building became a hotel in 1946.

References

External links
 Island Hotel & Restaurant
 Cedar Key, Florida in the Civil War

Buildings and structures in Levy County, Florida
Hotel buildings on the National Register of Historic Places in Florida
Vernacular architecture in Florida
Tabby buildings
1861 establishments in Florida
National Register of Historic Places in Levy County, Florida
Hotel buildings completed in 1861
Cedar Key, Florida